Gloeoporus taxicola is a species of fungus belonging to the family Irpicaceae.

Synonym:
 Meruliopsis taxicola (Pers.) Bondartsev, 1959

References

Irpicaceae